Sir John Leslie, 1st Baronet (16 December 1822 – 23 January 1916) was the son of Charles Powell Leslie (II) and grandson of Charles Powell Leslie (I) and his uncle was the Bishop, John Leslie. Leslie was a Conservative Member of Parliament for Monaghan from 1871 to 1880.  He succeeded his elder brother, Charles Powell Leslie III, in that role.

In 1830, he was sent to school at Dedham, Essex. During midsummer term, 1834, he joined his elder brother, Charles, at Harrow. In 1839, John entered Christ Church, Oxford. He obtained a commission in the 1st Lifeguards, and was quartered at the Regent's, Hyde Park, Windsor and Farnborough barracks.

In 1854, he met at Hazelwood a distinguished Waterloo veteran, Colonel George Dawson-Damer (younger brother of the 2nd Earl of Portarlington), and his daughter, Constance. Leslie married Miss Damer two years later at St George's, Hanover Square, London.  His new mother-in-law, Mrs Damer ("Minnie Seymour"), was the adopted daughter of George IV's wife, Maria, Mrs Fitzherbert.

Family
Sir John and Lady Constance Leslie had one son and four daughters:
Sir John Leslie, 2nd Baronet (1857–1944)
Mary Leslie (1858–1936)
Constance Christina Leslie (1861–1945)
Theodosia Leslie (1865–1940)
Olive Louisa Blanche Leslie (1872–1945)

References

Public Record Office of Northern Ireland
ThePeerage.com

1822 births
1916 deaths
British Life Guards officers
Baronets in the Baronetage of the United Kingdom
Irish Conservative Party MPs
Members of the Parliament of the United Kingdom for County Monaghan constituencies (1801–1922)
UK MPs 1868–1874
UK MPs 1874–1880
19th-century Anglo-Irish people
People educated at Harrow School
Alumni of Christ Church, Oxford
Oxford University cricketers
Marylebone Cricket Club cricketers
Irish cricketers